Mohydeen Izzat Quandour is a Jordanian author, television producer and director.

Bibliography 
Muridism: A Study of the Caucasian Wars 1819 - 1859 (BookSurge Publishing 2006)
The Skyjack Affair (BookSurge Publishing 2006)
Rupture (BookSurge Publishing 2006)
Kavkas Trilogy (Minerva Press 1998)
Revolution (WingSpan Press 2006)
Children of the Diaspora (WingSpan Press 2007)
The Balkan Story (WingSpan Press 2007)
Dangerous Encounters
Lost in Chechnya (WingSpan Press 2006)
The Legend (WingSpan Press 2006)
Iraq: Desert Crossings (WingSpan Press 2008)
The Last Hunt: A Novel of the New Russia (WingSpan Press 2006)
Desert Sunrise (WingSpan Press 2006)

As a film producer and director, Quandour spent several years in Hollywood working in television production on such series as Mannix and Bonanza. Later he directed several films including The Spectre of Edgar Allan Poe, Cold Wind, Eagle's Wings, and Yanco. His most recent films are Cherkess (2010), The Prisoner (2011), and A Facebook Romance (2013). He is currently president and senior partner of Sindika productions and actively developing projects (Sindika Productions) to produce/direct one feature film a year. He is also co-founder and partner of the SOCHI INTERNATIONAL FILM AWARDS Festival (SIFA)

References
The Cherkess Fund Mohydeen Izzat Quandour Bio
Barons "Who Is Who" 2009
The Millennium Biographies 2000
Authors Who is Who in America 1996

External links
Cherkess Fund website
Sindika Productions website
Facebook as Mohy Quandour

1938 births
Living people
Claremont Graduate University alumni
Earlham College alumni
Jordanian people of Circassian descent
Jordanian writers